Boralesgamuwa Urban Council is the local authority for Boralesgamuwa and surrounding suburbs in Sri Lanka.

History

Previously a part of the Kesbewa Pradeshiya Sabha, the Boralesgamuwa Urban Council was incorporated as a separate local government institution with effect from 15 April 2006 through a Special Gazette Notification No. 1426/15 dated 4 January 2006.

Geography

Wards 

For electoral and administrative purposes, the Council is divided into 10 wards:

 Pepiliyana
 Divulpitiya
 Rattanapitiya
 Boralesgamuwa West
 Bellanvila
 Werahera
 Boralesgamuwa East
 Bodhirajapura
 Katuwawala
 Neelammahara

References

Local authorities in Western Province, Sri Lanka
Urban councils of Sri Lanka